Buxar Lok Sabha constituency is one of the 40 Lok Sabha (parliamentary) constituencies in Bihar state in eastern India.

Assembly segments
Presently, Buxar Lok Sabha constituency comprises the following six Vidhan Sabha (legislative assembly) segments:

Members of Parliament
The following is the list of the Members of Parliament elected from this constituency

1952-1957
As Shahabad North-West Lok Sabha constituency.

1957-Present
As Buxar Lok Sabha constituency.

Election results

See also
 Buxar district
 List of Constituencies of the Lok Sabha

References

External links
Buxar lok sabha  constituency election 2019 result details

Lok Sabha constituencies in Bihar
Politics of Buxar district
Politics of Kaimur district
Politics of Rohtas district